Lee Emerson may refer to:

Lee E. Emerson (1898–1976), governor of Vermont
Lee Emerson (musician) (died 1978), American country music singer and songwriter